Joseph Oduol Angara (born 8 November 1971) is a former Kenyan cricketer who played One Day Internationals for Kenyan national team between 1997 and 2003, including at the 1999 and 2003 World Cups.

Career

As player 
One of Angara's best performances in ODIs came at the 2001 tri-series in South Africa. In the sixth match of the series, he returned figures of 3/30 helping his team defeat India. Playing his first game of the series, Angara bowled four maiden overs in his first spell, while claiming the wicket of Sachin Tendulkar bowling him out for 3. He was named player of the match.

As coach 
Angara is the current coach of the Botswana national cricket team, appointed in July 2015. He had earlier coached the Botswana national under-19 side at the 2015 Africa Under-19 Championship, and previously worked as a development coach with Cricket Kenya, which including coaching a Sahara Elite League franchise, the Northern Nomads.

References

External links 
 

Kenyan cricketers
Kenya One Day International cricketers
Northern Nomads cricketers
Cricketers from Nairobi
1971 births
Living people
Kenyan cricket coaches